The Browning School is an independent school for boys in New York City. It was founded in 1888 by John A. Browning. It offers instruction in grades kindergarten through 12th grade. The school is a member of the New York Interschool consortium.

History
The school was founded in 1888 by John A. Browning. Arthur Jones succeeded Browning as headmaster, in 1920, moved the school from West 55th Street to its present location on East 62nd Street, and also expanded extracurricular activities. Jones retired in 1948; Lyman B. Tobin, a Browning teacher for more than 30 years, became the school's third headmaster.

In 1952, upon Tobin's retirement, the school named teacher Charles W. Cook (class of 1938), as its fourth headmaster. Under his 36-year leadership, the Browning School expanded rapidly. After a lengthy fundraising drive, the school bought the adjoining carriage house and rebuilt it, and the new building opened in 1960. The school's expansion continued in 1967, with the building of a larger gymnasium on the roof and, in the late 1970s, with the acquisition of an interest in the building next door.

In 1988, Stephen M. Clement, III became Browning's fifth headmaster and served a tenure of 28 years. John M. Botti was appointed  Head of School in 2016. Serving over 400 students, the school has more than doubled its size 50 years. A new library, four new science laboratories, two new art studios, and additional classrooms have been built.

In 2021 Browning published Buzzwords, a new digital magazine, designed to tells the School's story in a fresh and compelling way. 

Browning is a part of the Interschool. Per tradition, the school year commences and closes with an assembly in Christ Church United Methodist.

Academics
Browning has a highly selective admissions process. The school does not typically accept transfer students for 11th and 12th grades.

There are approximately 25-34 boys per grade at the school. A financial aid program ensures that the boys remain heterogeneous; as with many of its peer NYC schools. The school is private, functioning under a New York City non-profit statute enacted in the 1940s. The school is governed by a Board of Trustees and administered by a Headmaster.

The school's upper-level curriculum consists of 10 departments: English, Maths, Science, History, Modern Foreign Languages (Spanish or French), Classics (Latin and Ancient Greek), Music, Visual Art, Technology, and Physical Education.

Athletics
Browning teams compete in interscholastic soccer, cross country, basketball, squash, baseball, tennis, table tennis, golf, and track. Interscholastic team sports are open to students in Grades Seven through Grade Twelve in good academic standing. Interscholastic competition in basketball begins at Grade Five. There are also intramural opportunities at Browning in the fall, winter, and spring. Finally, fencing is available at the Chapin School as a team sport through Interschool.

In anticipation of the fall and spring seasons, coaches provide preseason training to support boys in the honing of their game skills. Fall preseason camp takes place in the Berkshires at the end of August, and the spring camp is over break in Florida.

The athletic department makes use of both facilities at school and those of New York City. The soccer and baseball teams practice at fields on Randall's Island. The track team makes use of Randall's Island and Central Park. In addition to the Upper and Lower gyms at school, the basketball teams take advantage of the gymnasium facilities at Equinox, Basketball City, and Chelsea Piers for practices and games. The tennis team practices and plays a number of its matches at the National Tennis Center, home of the U.S. Open, in Flushing, Queens as well as The West Side Tennis Club in Forest Hills. Golf team practices are held at the driving ranges on Randall's Island and Chelsea Piers; matches are held at Mosholu.

Notable alumni
John D. Rockefeller, Jr. 1893
Percy Avery Rockefeller 1894
Harold Fowler McCormick 1891 
Ogden Mills Reid 1900
Christian A. Herter 1911
Frederic R. Coudert, Jr.
Whitman Knapp '27
R. Sargent Shriver '34
Claiborne Pell '36
Thomas Hedley Reynolds '38
Osborn Elliott '41
Arthur MacArthur IV '56
Thomas E. Lovejoy '59
Jeff Moss '59
Richard Ballantine
Linton Wells II, '63
Thomas Oliphant '63
Andrew Lack, '64
Howard Dean '66
Winthrop P. Rockefeller '66
Arthur Ochs Sulzberger, Jr. '70
Jamie Dimon '74
Chris Gifford '77
Paul Dano, Jr. '02
Laurent Manuel '03
Sam Morril ‘05
Skizzy Mars ‘11

Affiliated organizations
New York State Association of Independent Schools
New York Interschool Association, Inc.

References

External links
 Browning School website

Preparatory schools in New York City
Boys' schools in New York City
Private K-12 schools in Manhattan